National Route 150 is a national highway of Japan connecting Shimizu-ku, Shizuoka and Naka-ku, Hamamatsu in Japan, with a total length of 102.2 km (63.5 mi).

References

150
Roads in Shizuoka Prefecture